Nogometni klub Slavija Vevče, commonly referred to as NK Slavija Vevče or simply Slavija, was a Slovenian football club based in Vevče. The club was formed in 1921 and played in the Slovenian PrvaLiga in the 1994–95 season, after they replaced Svoboda before the start of the competition. They were sponsored by local printing company SET for most of the time, therefore their first team often played under the name SET Vevče rather than Slavija. In 1996, they merged with Slovan and moved to Kodeljevo to play there as ND Slovan-Slavija for three seasons. They have won the Slovenian Second League in 1996–97, but were then relegated from the first and second divisions in two seasons. After 1999, Slavija was eventually left out of the club's name, playing from then onwards only as Slovan.

Honours
Slovenian Second League
 Winners: 1996–97

References

Association football clubs established in 1921
Football clubs in Yugoslavia
Defunct football clubs in Slovenia
Football clubs in Ljubljana
1921 establishments in Slovenia